Bitwarden is a freemium open-source password management service that stores sensitive information such as website credentials in an encrypted vault. The platform offers a variety of client applications including a web interface, desktop applications, browser extensions, mobile apps, and a command-line interface. Bitwarden offers a free cloud-hosted service as well as the ability to self-host.

Desktop applications are available for Windows, MacOS, and Linux. Browser extensions include those for Chrome, Firefox, Safari, Edge, Opera, Vivaldi, Brave and Tor. Mobile apps for Android, iPhone, and iPad are available.

Client functionalities include 2FA login, passwordless login, biometric unlock, random password generator, password strength testing tool, login/form/app autofill, syncing across unlimited platforms and devices, storing unlimited number of items, sharing credentials, and storing variety of information including credit cards.

Features

Overall security
 Open-source codebase
 Zero-knowledge encryption, i.e, the company can't see the vault contents 
 End-to-end encryption of the stored vault data
 Uses AES-CBC 256-bit to encrypt vault data, and PBKDF2 SHA-256 / Argon2id to derive user's encryption key from the entered password.
 Third-party independent application/code-library/network-infrastructure audits and bug bounty program

 Vault storage
 Cloud synchronization (Microsoft Azure)with free version being able to sync across unlimited platforms and devices
 Can self-host the Bitwarden server on-premises, or with services such as DigitalOcean

Availability
 Variety of client applications including a web interface, desktop applications, browser extensions, mobile apps, and a command-line interface.
 Desktop applications are available for Windows, MacOS, and Linux 
 Browser extensions are available for Chrome, Firefox, Safari, Edge, Opera, Vivaldi, Brave and Tor.
 Mobile apps are available for Android, iPhone, and iPad 
 50+ languages and dialects supported, although not all available for all client apps
 Free, premium, 6-user account family plans, and business plans are available

 Items
 Items types such as logins, secure notes, credit cards, and identitieswhich free version can store in an unlimited number.
 Items can be organized into folders
 Customizable fields for login/auto-fill
 1GB encrypted file attachments and sharing for paid versions

TOTP / Authenticator function
 TOTP key storage for free version, plus code generator and automatic fill-in for paid customers

Imports/Exports
 Imports from over 50 password managers including Dashlane, Keeper and RoboForm
 Exports into JSON, encrypted JSON, or CSV

Access
 Biometric unlock via Touch ID, Face ID, Windows Hello, or Android Login with Biometrics
 Vault login by Two-factor authentication via authenticator apps and email in free version, with the addition of Duo, YubiKey, and FIDO U2F for paid customers, with recovery code to bypass the step if a 2FA device is unavailable.
 Login with single sign-on
 Web vault passwordless login via notification approval on a device

 Sharing
 Secure sharing of any texts (free version) including credentials, and files (paid versions) with others via "Send", i.e. sending a URL, via any means, that retrieves the sent information that can have expiration/deletion time, maximum access limit, and password
 Use an organization (such as family) and permission-based collections to securely share vault entries: 2 users + 2 collections for free and premium versions, and 6 users + unlimited collections for family plan.
 Designation of Bitwarden users as emergency contacts (for paid versions) that can request for account access in an emergency

Tools
 Password strength testing tool
 Through Have I Been Pwned?, data breach (available in the free version) and Exposed passwords reports
 Exposed, Reused, Weak passwords reports for paid customers 

Others
 Password history, to see the previous passwords for a login
 Autofill credentials/customizable fields into websites and other applications
 Configurable username generator
 Configurable password generator
 Switch between Bitwarden accounts on a website
 Integration with email alias/forwarding services including SimpleLogin, AnonAddy, Firefox Relay, Fastmail, and DuckDuckGo

Reception 
In January 2021, in its first password-protection program comparison, U.S. News & World Report selected Bitwarden as "Best Password Manager". In February, with competitor LastPass about to drop a feature in its free version, CNET recommended Bitwarden as best free app for password synchronization across multiple devices, while Lifehacker recommended it as "the best password manager for most people."

Critics have praised the features offered in the software's free version, and the low price of the premium tier compared to other managers. The product was named the best "budget pick" in a Wirecutter password manager comparison. Bitwarden's secure open source implementation was also praised by reviewers. However, the software was criticized for its lack of additional features, and some reviewers noted its basic and less intuitive interface compared to other password managers.

History
2016-2017
Bitwarden debuted in August 2016 with an initial release of mobile applications for iOS and Android, browser extensions for Chrome and Opera, and a web vault. The browser extension for Firefox was later launched in February 2017. In February 2017, the Brave web browser began including the Bitwarden extension as an optional replacement password manager. 

In September 2017, Bitwarden launched a bug bounty program at HackerOne.

2018
In January 2018, the Bitwarden browser extension was adapted to and released for Apple's Safari browser through the Safari Extensions Gallery.

In February 2018, Bitwarden debuted as a stand-alone desktop application for macOS, Linux, and Windows. It was built as a web app variant of the browser extension and delivered on top of Electron. The Windows app was released alongside the Bitwarden extension for Microsoft Edge in the Microsoft Store a month later.

In March 2018, Bitwarden's web vault was criticized for embedding unconstrained third-party JavaScript from BootstrapCDN, Braintree, Google, and Stripe. These embedded scripts could pose as an attack vector to gain unauthorized access to Bitwarden users' passwords. These third-party scripts were removed as part of the Bitwarden 2.0 Web Vault update, released in July 2018.

In May 2018, Bitwarden released a command-line application enabling users to write scripted applications using data from their Bitwarden vaults. 

In June 2018, Cliqz performed a privacy and security review of the Bitwarden for Firefox browser extension and concluded that it would not negatively impact their users. Following the review, Bitwarden was made available as an optional password manager in the Cliqz web browser.

In October 2018, Bitwarden completed a security assessment, code audit, and cryptographic analysis from third-party security auditing firm Cure53.

2020
In July 2020, Bitwarden completed another security audit from security firm Insight Risk Consulting to evaluate the security of the Bitwarden network perimeter as well as penetration testing and vulnerability assessments against Bitwarden web services and applications.

In August 2020, Bitwarden achieved SOC 2 Type 2 and SOC 3 certification.

In December 2020, Bitwarden announced that it was HIPAA compliant in addition to already being GDPR, CCPA, and Privacy Shield compliant.

2021
In August 2021, Bitwarden announced that network assessment (security assessment and penetration testing) for 2021 
had been completed by the firm Insight Risk Consulting.

2022
In September 2022, the company announced $100M series B financing; the lead investor was PSG, with the existing investor, Battery Ventures, participating. The investment would be used to accelerate product development and company growth to support its users and customers worldwide. 
2023
In January, Bitwarden announced the acquisition of Swedish startup Passwordless.dev for an undisclosed amount.
Passwordless.dev provided an open source solution allowing developers to easily implement passwordless authentication based on the standards WebAuthn and FIDO2.
Bitwarden also launched a beta software service allowing third-party developers the use of biometric sign-in technologies including Touch ID, Face ID and Windows Hello in their apps.

In February, Bitwarden published network security assessment and security assessment reports that were conducted by Cure53 in May and October 2022 respectively.
The first related to penetration testing and security assessment across Bitwarden IPs, servers, and web applications.
The second related to penetration testing and source code audit against all Bitwarden password manager software components, including the core application, browser extension, desktop application, web application, and TypeScript library.
Ghacks reported that "No critical issues were discovered during the two audits. Two security issues that Cure53 rated high were discovered during the source code audit and penetration testing. These were fixed quickly by Bitwarden and the third-party HubSpot. All other issues were either rated low or informational only."

See also 
 List of password managers
 Password manager
 Cryptography

References

External links 
 
 Bitwarden Password Manager   Add-ons for Firefox
 Bitwarden - Chrome Web Store
 Bitwarden - Microsoft Edge Addons
 Bitwarden extension - Opera add-ons
 Installing Bitwarden on Raspberry Pi using Docker

Password managers
Cryptographic software
Nonfree Firefox WebExtensions
Internet Explorer add-ons
Google Chrome extensions
Microsoft Edge extensions
Windows software
MacOS software
Linux software
IOS software
Android (operating system) software
2016 software